Anwarul Hossain Khan Chowdhury is a founder member of Bangladesh Nationalist Party politician and the former Member of Parliament of Mymensingh-9. He was an advisor to Late President Ziaur Rahman

Career
Choudhury was elected to parliament from Mymensingh-9 as a Bangladesh Nationalist Party candidate in 1979, 1991 and 1996 Parliament. He was the founder of Zia Hall of Dhaka University and an elected member of Dhaka University Senate and Syndicate. He was the Convenor and later the elected President of Mymensingh District North Bangladesh Nationalist Party.

References

Bangladesh Nationalist Party politicians
Living people
5th Jatiya Sangsad members
Year of birth missing (living people)